Stictea ejectana, the guava bud moth, is a moth of the  family Tortricidae. It was described by Francis Walker in 1863.  It is found on Fiji, Samoa, the Marquesas Archipelago, Tahiti, Rapa Iti, the southern Mariana Islands, the Philippines and in New Caledonia, New Zealand and Australia (New South Wales, Tasmania and Western Australia).

The wingspan is about 20 mm. Adults are brown with a complex pattern on the forewings.

The larvae feed on Thryptomene calycina, Psidium guajava, Psidium littorale, Syzygium jambos, Eugenia uniflora and Metrosideros collina.

References

Moths described in 1863
Olethreutini
Moths of New Zealand